The 1922 Centre Praying Colonels football team represented Centre College in the 1922 college football season. The Praying Colonels scored 296 points while allowing 52 points and finished 8–2–0. The season featured handing V. P. I its only loss of the season, and a big upset in the South when the Colonels lost to the Auburn Tigers.

James "Red" Roberts (at both end and tackle), Ed Kubale (center) and Herb Covington (quarterback) were named to the 1922 College Football All-America Team.

Before the season
McMillin, Armstrong, James, Murphy, and Cregor graduated.

Schedule

References

Centre
Centre Colonels football seasons
Centre Praying Colonels football